Imortal Desportivo Clube (abbreviated as Imortal DC and colloquially known as Imortal de Albufeira) is a Portuguese sports club centered around a football club based in the city of Albufeira, in the Portuguese region of Algarve. Imortal has also a quite noteworthy basketball team which has played in the Liga Portuguesa de Basquetebol, the top lay tier in professional basketball in Portugal.

Background
Imortal DC currently plays in Campeonato de Portugal which is now the fourth tier of the Portuguese football league system since a new league (Liga 3) was created in 2021. They finished 1st of the Algarve FA regional league in the 2020-2021 season as the league came to an end due to the COVID-19 pandemic, and the team with most points (Imortal DC at the time) was promoted to the Campeonato de Portugal. The club was founded in 1920 and they play their home matches at the Estádio Municipal de Albufeira in Albufeira. The club's main achievement was winning the Segunda Divisão Série Sul in 1998–99. This was followed by their highest league placing in 1999–2000 when they finished in 15th place in the Liga de Honra. Their second season in tier 2 in 2000–01 resulted in relegation and then followed a period of decline, including the withdrawal of a main sponsor, which culminated in them playing in AF Algarve 2ª Divisão, the sixth tier of Portuguese football, in 2008–09.

The club is affiliated to Associação de Futebol do Algarve and also competes in the AF Algarve Taça – The Algarve Cup. They reached the final in 2008–2009 while still in the 2ª Divisão. The club has also entered the national cup competition known as Taça de Portugal on many occasions.

The club has fairly successful teams at U-19 and U-17 level, as well as teams in lower age groups and small side football for the youngest boys – there are no women's or girls teams.

Fixtures and results can be found at the Algarve FA website. Most first team matches are played on Sundays at 3pm or 5 pm. The season begins at the end of September and ends in mid-May with the Algarve Cup Final.

Players

Current squad

Season to season

Honours
Portuguese Second Division: 1998–99 (Série Sul)

Notable former players

 Calita
 Eldon Maquemba
 Vali Gasimov
 Ali Gholami Morcheh Khorti
 Detinho
 Jean Paulista
 René Rivas
 Zé Guilherme
 Lito
 Pelé
 Dossa Júnior
 Israel Castro Franco
 Abdoul Salam Sow
 Chiquinho Conde
 Chiquinho Delgado
 Tiago Ilori
 Hélder Lourenço
 João Paulo da Silva Gouveia Morais
 Nuno Filipe Martins Rodrigues
 Vítor Valente

Notable former coaches
 Iosif Fabian
 Ricardo Formosinho
 Paco Fortes
 Nikola Spasov

Gallery

Footnotes

External links
 Facebook page

 
Football clubs in Portugal
Association football clubs established in 1920
1920 establishments in Portugal
Liga Portugal 2 clubs